Balleh may refer to:
Balleh River, in Malaysia